Lee Young-ju (born 22 April 1992) is a South Korean professional footballer who plays as a midfielder for Hyundai Steel Red Angels and the South Korea women's national team.

International career
Lee played five matches for the South Korea U17 team in 2007 and 2008, and was part of the squad for the 2008 FIFA U-17 Women's World Cup, playing in one group match against Nigeria. She subsequently played fifteen matches for the South Korea U20 team between 2009 and 2012 and was a member of the squad that finished third in the 2010 FIFA U-20 Women's World Cup and reached the quarter-finals of the 2012 FIFA U-20 Women's World Cup. She made her full international debut on 17 September 2014 in a 2014 Asian Games match against India.

International goals

References

External links

1992 births
Living people
South Korean women's footballers
South Korea women's under-17 international footballers
South Korea women's under-20 international footballers
South Korea women's international footballers
Women's association football midfielders
Asian Games bronze medalists for South Korea
Asian Games medalists in football
Footballers at the 2014 Asian Games
Medalists at the 2014 Asian Games
2019 FIFA Women's World Cup players
WK League players
Incheon Hyundai Steel Red Angels WFC players